

Events

Pre-1600
98 – Trajan succeeds his adoptive father Nerva as Roman emperor; under his rule the Roman Empire will reach its maximum extent.
 945 – The co-emperors Stephen and Constantine are overthrown and forced to become monks by Constantine VII, who becomes sole emperor of the Byzantine Empire.
1186 – Henry VI, the son and heir of the Holy Roman Emperor Frederick I, marries Constance of Sicily.
1302 – Dante Alighieri is condemned in absentia and exiled from Florence.
1343 – Pope Clement VI issues the papal bull Unigenitus to justify the power of the pope and the use of indulgences. Nearly 200 years later, Martin Luther would protest this.

1601–1900
1606 – Gunpowder Plot: The trial of Guy Fawkes and other conspirators begins, ending with their execution on January 31.
1695 – Mustafa II becomes the Ottoman sultan and Caliph of Islam in Istanbul on the death of Ahmed II. Mustafa rules until his abdication in 1703.
1759 – Spanish forces clash with indigenous Huilliches of southern Chile in the battle of Río Bueno.
1776 – American Revolutionary War: Henry Knox's "noble train of artillery" arrives in Cambridge, Massachusetts.
1785 – The University of Georgia is founded, the first public university in the United States.
1820 – A Russian expedition led by Fabian Gottlieb von Bellingshausen and Mikhail Petrovich Lazarev discovers the Antarctic continent, approaching the Antarctic coast.
1825 – The U.S. Congress approves Indian Territory (in what is present-day Oklahoma), clearing the way for forced relocation of the Eastern Indians on the "Trail of Tears".
1868 – Boshin War: The Battle of Toba–Fushimi begins, between forces of the Tokugawa shogunate and pro-Imperial factions; it will end in defeat for the shogunate, and is a pivotal point in the Meiji Restoration.
1869 – Boshin War: Tokugawa rebels establish the Ezo Republic in Hokkaidō.
1874 – Modest Mussorgsky's opera Boris Godunov premieres in Mariinsky Theatre in St.Petersburg
1880 – Thomas Edison receives a patent for his incandescent lamp.

1901–present
1916 – World War I: The British government passes the Military Service Act that introduces conscription in the United Kingdom.
1918 – Beginning of the Finnish Civil War.
1924 – Six days after his death Lenin's body is carried into a specially erected mausoleum.
1927 – Ibn Saud takes the title of King of Nejd.
1928 – Bundaberg tragedy: a diphtheria vaccine is contaminated with Staph. aureus bacterium, resulting in the deaths of twelve children in the Australian town of Bundaberg.
1939 – First flight of the Lockheed P-38 Lightning.
1943 – World War II: The Eighth Air Force sorties ninety-one B-17s and B-24s to attack the U-boat construction yards at Wilhelmshaven, Germany. This was the first American bombing attack on Germany.
1944 – World War II: The 900-day Siege of Leningrad is lifted.
1945 – World War II: The Soviet 322nd Rifle Division liberates the remaining inmates of Auschwitz-Birkenau. 
1951 – Nuclear testing at the Nevada Test Site begins with Operation Ranger.
1961 – The Soviet submarine S-80 sinks when its snorkel malfunctions, flooding the boat.
1965 – South Vietnamese Prime Minister Trần Văn Hương is removed by the military junta of Nguyễn Khánh.
1967 – Apollo program: Astronauts Gus Grissom, Ed White and Roger Chaffee are killed in a fire during a test of their Apollo 1 spacecraft at the Kennedy Space Center, Florida.
  1967   – Cold War: The Soviet Union, the United States, and the United Kingdom sign the Outer Space Treaty in Washington, D.C., banning deployment of nuclear weapons in space, and limiting the usage of the Moon and other celestial bodies to peaceful purposes.
1973 – The Paris Peace Accords officially ends the Vietnam War. Colonel William Nolde is killed in action becoming the conflict's last recorded American combat casualty.
1980 – Through cooperation between the U.S. and Canadian governments, six American diplomats secretly escape hostilities in Iran in the culmination of the Canadian Caper.
1983 – The pilot shaft of the Seikan Tunnel, the world's longest sub-aqueous tunnel (53.85 km) between the Japanese islands of Honshū and Hokkaidō, breaks through.
1996 – In a military coup, Colonel Ibrahim Baré Maïnassara deposes the first democratically elected president of Niger, Mahamane Ousmane.
  1996   – Germany first observes the International Holocaust Remembrance Day.
2002 – An explosion at a military storage facility in Lagos, Nigeria, kills at least 1,100 people and displaces over 20,000 others.
2003 – The first selections for the National Recording Registry are announced by the Library of Congress.
2010 – The 2009 Honduran constitutional crisis ends when Porfirio Lobo Sosa becomes the new President of Honduras.
  2010   – Apple announces the iPad. 
2011 – Arab Spring: The Yemeni Revolution begins as over 16,000 protestors demonstrate in Sana'a.
  2011   – Within Ursa Minor, H1504+65, a white dwarf with the hottest known surface temperature in the universe at 200,000 K, was documented.
2013 – Two hundred and forty-two people die in a nightclub fire in the Brazilian city of Santa Maria, Rio Grande do Sul.
2014 – Rojava conflict: The Kobanî Canton declares its autonomy from the Syrian Arab Republic.
2017 – A naming ceremony for the chemical element tennessine takes place in the United States.
2023 – Protests and public outrage spark across the U.S. after the release of multiple videos by the Memphis Police Department showing officers punching, kicking, and pepper spraying Tyre Nichols as a result of running away from a traffic stop, which resulted him dying in the hospital three days later after the incident.

Births

Pre-1600
1365 – Edward of Angoulême, English noble (d. 1370)
1443 – Albert III, Duke of Saxony (d. 1500)
1546 – Joachim III Frederick, Elector of Brandenburg (d. 1608)
1571 – Abbas I of Persia (d. 1629)
1585 – Hendrick Avercamp, Dutch painter (d. 1634)

1601–1900
1603 – Sir Harbottle Grimston, 2nd Baronet, English lawyer and politician, Speaker of the House of Commons (d. 1685)
  1603   – Humphrey Mackworth, English politician, lawyer and judge (d. 1654)
1621 – Thomas Willis, English physician and anatomist (d. 1675)
1662 – Richard Bentley, English scholar and theologian (d. 1742)
1663 – George Byng, 1st Viscount Torrington, Royal Navy admiral (d. 1733)
1687 – Johann Balthasar Neumann, German engineer and architect, designed Würzburg Residence and Basilica of the Fourteen Holy Helpers (d. 1753)
1701 – Johann Nikolaus von Hontheim, German historian and theologian (d. 1790)
1708 – Grand Duchess Anna Petrovna of Russia (d. 1728)
1741 – Hester Thrale, Welsh author (d. 1821)
1756 – Wolfgang Amadeus Mozart, Austrian pianist and composer (d. 1791)
1775 – Friedrich Wilhelm Joseph Schelling, German-Swiss philosopher and academic (d. 1854)
1782 – Titumir, Bengali revolutionary (d. 1831)
1790 – Juan Álvarez, Mexican general and president (1855) (d. 1867)
1795 – Eli Whitney Blake, American engineer, invented the Mortise lock (d. 1886)
1803 – Eunice Hale Waite Cobb, American writer, public speaker, and activist (d. 1880)
1805 – Maria Anna of Bavaria (d. 1877)
  1805   – Samuel Palmer, English painter and etcher (d. 1881)
1806 – Juan Crisóstomo Arriaga, Spanish composer and educator (d. 1826)
1808 – David Strauss, German theologian and author (d. 1874)
1814 – Eugène Viollet-le-Duc, French architect, designed the Lausanne Cathedral (d. 1879)
1821 – John Chivington, American colonel and pastor (d. 1892)
1823 – Édouard Lalo, French violinist and composer (d. 1892)
1824 – Urbain Johnson, Canadian farmer and political figure (d. 1917)
1826 – Mikhail Saltykov-Shchedrin, Russian journalist and author (d. 1889)
  1826   – Richard Taylor, American general, historian, and politician (d. 1879)
1832 – Lewis Carroll, English novelist, poet, and mathematician (d. 1898)
  1832   – Carl Friedrich Schmidt, Estonian-Russian geologist and botanist (d. 1908)
1836 – Leopold von Sacher-Masoch, Austrian journalist and author (d. 1895)
1842 – Arkhip Kuindzhi, Ukrainian-Russian painter (d. 1910)
1848 – Tōgō Heihachirō, Japanese admiral (d. 1934)
1850 – John Collier, English painter and author (d. 1934)
  1850   – Samuel Gompers, English-American labor leader (d. 1924)
  1850   – Edward Smith, English captain (d. 1912)
1858 – Neel Doff, Dutch-Belgian author (d. 1942)
1859 – Wilhelm II, German Emperor (d. 1941)
1869 – Will Marion Cook, American violinist and composer (d. 1944)
1878 – Dorothy Scarborough, American author (d. 1935)
1885 – Jerome Kern, American composer and songwriter (d. 1945)
  1885   – Seison Maeda, Japanese painter (d. 1977)
1886 – Radhabinod Pal, Indian academic and jurist (d. 1967)
1889 – Balthasar van der Pol, Dutch physicist and academic (d. 1959)
1893 – Soong Ching-ling, Chinese politician, Honorary President of the People's Republic of China (d. 1981)
1895 – Joseph Rosenstock, Polish-American conductor and manager (d. 1985)
  1895   – Harry Ruby, American composer and screenwriter (d. 1974)
1900 – Hyman G. Rickover, American admiral (d. 1986)

1901–present
1901 – Willy Fritsch, German actor (d. 1973)
  1901   – Art Rooney, American football player, coach and owner (d. 1988)
1903 – John Eccles, Australian-Swiss neurophysiologist and academic, Nobel Prize laureate (d. 1997)
1904 – James J. Gibson, American psychologist and academic (d. 1979)
1905 – Howard McNear, American actor (d. 1969)
1908 – William Randolph Hearst, Jr., American journalist and publisher (d. 1993)
1910 – Edvard Kardelj, Slovene general, economist, and politician, 2nd Foreign Minister of Yugoslavia (d. 1979)
1912 – Arne Næss, Norwegian philosopher and environmentalist (d. 2009)
  1912   – Francis Rogallo, American engineer, invented the Rogallo wing (d. 2009)
1913 – Michael Ripper, English actor (d. 2000) 
1915 – Jules Archer, American historian and author (d. 2008)
  1915   – Jacques Hnizdovsky, Ukrainian-American painter, sculptor, and illustrator (d. 1985)
1918 – Skitch Henderson, American pianist, composer, and conductor (d. 2005)
  1918   – Elmore James, American singer-songwriter and guitarist (d. 1963)
  1918   – William Seawell, American general (d. 2005)
1919 – Ross Bagdasarian, Sr., American singer-songwriter, pianist, producer, and actor, created Alvin and the Chipmunks (d. 1972)
1920 – Hiroyoshi Nishizawa, Japanese lieutenant and pilot (d. 1944)
  1920   – Helmut Zacharias, German violinist and composer (d. 2002)
1921 – Donna Reed, American actress (d. 1986)
1924 – Rauf Denktaş, Cypriot lawyer and politician, 1st President of Northern Cyprus (d. 2012)
  1924   – Brian Rix, English actor, producer, and politician (d. 2016)
  1924   – Harvey Shapiro, American poet (d. 2013)
1926 – Fritz Spiegl, Austrian flute player and journalist (d. 2003)
  1926   – Ingrid Thulin, Swedish actress (d. 2004)
1928 – Hans Modrow, Polish-German lawyer and politician, 5th Prime Minister of East Germany (d. 2023)
1929 – Mohamed Al-Fayed, Egyptian-Swiss businessman
  1929   – Michael Craig, Indian-English actor and screenwriter
  1929   – Gastón Suárez, Bolivian author and playwright (d. 1984)
1930 – Bobby "Blue" Bland, American blues singer-songwriter (d. 2013)
1931 – Mordecai Richler, Canadian author and screenwriter (d. 2001)
  1931   – Nigel Vinson, Baron Vinson, English lieutenant and businessman
1932 – Boris Shakhlin, Russian-Ukrainian gymnast (d. 2008)
  1933   – Jerry Buss, American chemist and businessman (d. 2013)
1934 – Édith Cresson, French politician and diplomat, Prime Minister of France
  1934   – George Follmer, American race car driver
1935 – Steve Demeter, American baseball player, coach, and manager (d. 2013)
1936 – Troy Donahue, American actor (d. 2001)
  1936   – Samuel C. C. Ting, American physicist and academic, Nobel Prize laureate
1937 – Fred Åkerström, Swedish singer-songwriter and guitarist (d. 1985)
1940 – Ahmet Kurtcebe Alptemoçin, Turkish engineer and politician, 35th Turkish Minister of Foreign Affairs
  1940   – James Cromwell, American actor
  1940   – Terry Harper, Canadian ice hockey player and coach
  1940   – Petru Lucinschi, Romanian activist and politician, 2nd President of Moldova
  1940   – Reynaldo Rey, American actor and screenwriter (d. 2015)
1941 – Beatrice Tinsley, New Zealand astronomer and cosmologist (d. 1981)
1942 – Maki Asakawa, Japanese singer-songwriter and producer (d. 2010)
  1942   – Tasuku Honjo, Japanese immunologist, Nobel Prize laureate in Physiology or Medicine
  1942   – John Witherspoon, American actor and comedian (d. 2019)
  1942   – Kate Wolf, American singer-songwriter and guitarist (d. 1986)
1943 – Julia Cumberlege, Baroness Cumberlege, English businesswoman and politician
1944 – Peter Akinola, Nigerian archbishop
  1944   – Mairead Maguire, Northern Irish activist, Nobel Prize laureate
  1944   – Nick Mason, English drummer, songwriter, and producer
1945 – Harold Cardinal, Canadian lawyer and politician (d. 2005)
1946 – Christopher Hum, English academic and diplomat, British Ambassador to China
  1946   – Nedra Talley, American singer
1947 – Björn Afzelius, Swedish singer-songwriter and guitarist (d. 1999)
  1947   – Vyron Polydoras, Greek lawyer and politician, Greek Minister for Public Order
  1947   – Cal Schenkel, American painter and illustrator
  1947   – Philip Sugden, English historian and author (d. 2014)
  1947   – Perfecto Yasay Jr., Filipino lawyer and Secretary of Foreign Affairs of the Philippines (d. 2020)
1948 – Mikhail Baryshnikov, Russian-American dancer, choreographer, and actor
  1948   – Jean-Philippe Collard, French pianist
1951 – Seth Justman, American keyboard player and songwriter
  1951   – Cees van der Knaap, Dutch soldier and politician
1952 – Brian Gottfried, American tennis player
  1952   – Billy Johnson, American football player and coach
  1952   – Tam O'Shaughnessy, American tennis player, psychologist, and academic
  1952   – G. E. Smith, American guitarist and songwriter
1954 – Peter Laird, American author and illustrator
  1954   – Ed Schultz, American talk show host and sportscaster (d. 2018)
1955 – Brian Engblom, Canadian ice hockey player and sportscaster
  1955   – John Roberts, American lawyer and judge, 17th Chief Justice of the United States
1956 – Mimi Rogers, American actress
1957 – Janick Gers, English guitarist and songwriter 
  1957   – Frank Miller, American illustrator, director, producer, and screenwriter
1958 – James Grippando, American lawyer and author
  1958   – Alan Milburn, English businessman and politician, Chancellor of the Duchy of Lancaster
  1958   – Susanna Thompson, American actress
1959 – Cris Collinsworth, American football player and sportscaster
  1959   – Göran Hägglund, Swedish lawyer and politician, 28th Swedish Minister for Social Affairs
  1959   – Keith Olbermann, American journalist and author
1960 – Fiona O'Donnell, Canadian-Scottish politician
1961 – Narciso Rodriguez, American fashion designer
  1961   – Margo Timmins, Canadian singer-songwriter
1962 – Roberto Paci Dalò, Italian director and composer
1963 – George Monbiot, English-Welsh author and activist
1964 – Patrick van Deurzen, Dutch composer and academic
  1964   – Bridget Fonda, American actress
1965 – Alan Cumming, Scottish-American actor
  1965   – Mike Newell, English footballer and manager
  1965   – Ignacio Noé, Argentinian author and illustrator
  1965   – Attila Sekerlioglu, Austrian footballer and manager
1966 – Tamlyn Tomita, Japanese-American actress and singer
1967 – Dave Manson, Canadian ice hockey player and coach
1968 – Tracy Lawrence, American country singer
  1968   – Mike Patton, American singer, composer, and voice artist
  1968   – Matt Stover, American football player
1969 – Michael Kulas, Canadian singer-songwriter and producer 
  1969   – Patton Oswalt, American comedian and actor
  1969   – Shane Thomson, New Zealand cricketer
1970 – Bradley Clyde, Australian rugby league player
  1970   – Dean Headley, English cricketer and coach
1971 – Patrice Brisebois, Canadian ice hockey player and coach
1972 – Bibi Gaytán, Mexican singer and actress
  1972   – Josh Randall, American actor
  1972   – Bryant Young, American football player and coach
1973 – Valyantsin Byalkevich, Belarusian footballer and manager (d. 2014)
1974 – Ole Einar Bjørndalen, Norwegian skier and biathlete
  1974   – Andrei Pavel, Romanian tennis player and coach
  1974   – Chaminda Vaas, Sri Lankan cricketer and coach
1976 – Ahn Jung-hwan, South Korean footballer
  1976   – Danielle George , American professor
1978 – Pete Laforest, Canadian-American baseball player and manager
  1979   – Daniel Vettori, New Zealand cricketer and coach
1980 – Chanda Gunn, American ice hockey player and coach
  1980   – Marat Safin, Russian tennis player and politician
1981 – Alicia Molik, Australian tennis player and sportscaster
  1981   – Tony Woodcock, New Zealand rugby player
1982 – Eva Asderaki, Greek tennis umpire
1983 – Carlo Colaiacovo, Canadian ice hockey player
  1983   – Paulo Colaiacovo, Canadian ice hockey player
  1983   – Gavin Floyd, American baseball player
  1983   – Lee Grant, English footballer
1984 – Vince Mellars, New Zealand rugby league player
1987 – Katy Rose, American singer-songwriter and producer
  1987   – Anton Shunin, Russian footballer
1988 – Kerlon, Brazilian footballer
1989 – Alberto Botía, Spanish footballer
1991 – Christian Bickel, German footballer
  1991   – Sebastine Ikahihifo, New Zealand rugby league player
1992 – Stefano Pettinari, Italian footballer
1994 – Jack Stephens, English footballer
1995 – Harrison Reed, English footballer
2000 – Cory Paix, Australian rugby league player

Deaths

Pre-1600
98 – Nerva, Roman emperor (b. 35)
 457 – Marcian, Byzantine emperor (b. 392)
 555 – Yuan Di, emperor of the Liang Dynasty (b. 508)
 672 – Pope Vitalian
 847 – Pope Sergius II (b. 790)
 906 – Liu Can, chancellor of the Tang Dynasty
 931 – Ruotger, archbishop of Trier
 947 – Zhang Yanze, Chinese general and governor
1062 – Adelaide of Hungary, (b. c. 1040)
1311 – Külüg Khan, Emperor Wuzong of Yuan
1377 – Frederick the Simple, King of Sicily
1490 – Ashikaga Yoshimasa, Japanese shōgun (b. 1435)
1504 – Ludovico II, Marquess of Saluzzo (b. 1438)
1540 – Angela Merici, Italian educator and saint, founded the Company of St. Ursula (b. 1474)
1592 – Gian Paolo Lomazzo, Italian painter (b. 1538)
1596 – Francis Drake, English captain and explorer (b. 1540)

1601–1900
1629 – Hieronymus Praetorius, German organist and composer (b. 1560)
1638 – Gonzalo de Céspedes y Meneses, Spanish author and poet (b. 1585)
1651 – Abraham Bloemaert, Dutch painter and illustrator (b. 1566)
1688 – Empress Dowager Xiaozhuang of China (b. 1613)
1689 – Robert Aske, English merchant and philanthropist (b. 1619)
1731 – Bartolomeo Cristofori, Italian instrument maker, invented the Piano (b. 1655)
1733 – Thomas Woolston, English theologian and author (b. 1669)
1740 – Louis Henri, Duke of Bourbon (b. 1692)
1770 – Philippe Macquer, French historian (b. 1720)
1794 – Antoine Philippe de La Trémoille, French general (b. 1765)
1812 – John Perkins, Anglo-Jamaican captain
1814 – Johann Gottlieb Fichte, German philosopher and academic (b. 1762)
1816 – Samuel Hood, 1st Viscount Hood, English admiral and politician (b. 1724)
1851 – John James Audubon, French-American ornithologist and painter (b. 1789)
1852 – Paavo Ruotsalainen, Finnish farmer and lay preacher (b. 1777)
1860 – János Bolyai, Romanian-Hungarian mathematician and academic (b. 1802)
1873 – Adam Sedgwick, British geologist, Anglican priest and doctoral advisor to Charles Darwin (b. 1785)
1880 – Edward Middleton Barry, English architect and academic, co-designed the Halifax Town Hall and the Royal Opera House (b. 1830)

1901–present
1901 – Giuseppe Verdi, Italian composer (b. 1813)
1910 – Thomas Crapper, English plumber and businessman (b. 1836)
1919 – Endre Ady, Hungarian poet and journalist (b. 1877)
1921 – Maurice Buckley, Australian sergeant (b. 1891)
1922 – Nellie Bly, American journalist and author (b. 1864)
1927 – Jurgis Matulaitis-Matulevičius, Lithuanian bishop (b. 1871)
1931 – Nishinoumi Kajirō II, Japanese sumo wrestler, the 25th Yokozuna (b. 1880)
1940 – Isaac Babel, Russian short story writer, journalist, and playwright (b. 1894)
1942 – Kaarel Eenpalu, Estonian journalist and politician, Prime Minister of Estonia (b. 1888)
1951 – Carl Gustaf Emil Mannerheim, Finnish field marshal and politician, 6th President of Finland (b. 1867)
1956 – Erich Kleiber, Austrian conductor and director (b. 1890)
1961 – Bernard Friedberg, Austrian scholar and author (b. 1876)
1963 – John Farrow, Australian-American director, producer, and screenwriter (b. 1904)
1965 – Abraham Walkowitz, American painter (b. 1878)
1967 – crew of Apollo 1
                Roger B. Chaffee, American pilot, engineer, and astronaut (b. 1935)
                Gus Grissom, American pilot and astronaut (b. 1926)
                Ed White, American colonel, engineer, and astronaut (b. 1930)
  1967   – Alphonse Juin, Algerian-French general (b. 1888)
1970 – Rocco D'Assunta, Italian actor, comedian and playwright (b. 1904)
  1970   – Marietta Blau, Austrian physicist and academic (b. 1894)
1971 – Jacobo Árbenz, Guatemalan captain and politician, President of Guatemala (b. 1913)
1972 – Mahalia Jackson, American singer (b. 1911)
1973 – William Nolde, American colonel (b. 1929)
1974 – Georgios Grivas, Cypriot general (b. 1898)
1975 – Bill Walsh, American screenwriter and producer (b. 1913)
1979 – Victoria Ocampo. Argentine writer (b. 1890)
1982 – Trần Văn Hương, South Vietnamese politician, 3rd President of South Vietnam, 3rd Vice President of South Vietnam, and 3rd Prime Minister of South Vietnam (b. 1902)
1983 – Louis de Funès, French actor and screenwriter (b. 1914)
1986 – Lilli Palmer, German-American actress (b. 1914)
1987 – Norman McLaren, Scottish-Canadian animator and director (b. 1914)
1988 – Massa Makan Diabaté, Malian historian, author, and playwright (b. 1938)
1989 – Thomas Sopwith, English ice hockey player and pilot (b. 1888)
1993 – André the Giant, French professional wrestler and actor (b. 1946)
1994 – Claude Akins, American actor (b. 1918)
1996 – Ralph Yarborough, American colonel, lawyer, and politician (b. 1903)
2000 – Friedrich Gulda, Austrian pianist and composer (b. 1930)
2003 – Henryk Jabłoński, Polish historian and politician, President of Poland (b. 1909)
2004 – Salvador Laurel, Filipino lawyer and politician, 10th Vice President of the Philippines (b. 1928)
  2004   – Jack Paar, American talk show host and author (b. 1918)
2006 – Gene McFadden, American singer-songwriter and producer (b. 1948)
  2006   – Johannes Rau, German journalist and politician, 8th President of Germany (b. 1931)
2007 – Yang Chuan-kwang, Taiwanese decathlete, long jumper, and hurdler (b. 1933)
2008 – Suharto, Indonesian general and politician, 2nd President of Indonesia (b. 1921)
  2008   – Gordon B. Hinckley, American religious leader and author, 15th President of The Church of Jesus Christ of Latter-day Saints (b. 1910)
  2008   – Louie Welch, American businessman and politician, 54th Mayor of Houston (b. 1918)
2009 – John Updike, American novelist, short story writer, and critic (b. 1932)
  2009   – R. Venkataraman, Indian lawyer and politician, 8th President of India (b. 1910)
2010 – Zelda Rubinstein, American actress (b. 1933)
  2010   – J. D. Salinger, American soldier and author (b. 1919)
  2010   – Howard Zinn, American historian, author, and activist (b. 1922)
2011 – Charlie Callas, American comedian and musician (b. 1927)
2012 – Greg Cook, American football player and sportscaster (b. 1946)
  2012   – Ted Dicks, English composer and screenwriter (b. 1928)
  2012   – Jeannette Hamby, American nurse and politician (b. 1933)
  2012   – Kevin White, American politician, 51st Mayor of Boston (b. 1929)
2013 – Ivan Bodiul, Ukrainian-Russian politician (b. 1918)
  2013   – Stanley Karnow, American journalist and historian (b. 1925)
2014 – Pete Seeger, American singer-songwriter, guitarist and activist (b. 1919)
  2014   – Epimaco Velasco, Filipino lawyer and politician, Governor of Cavite (b. 1935)
  2014   – Paul Zorner, German soldier and pilot (b. 1920)
2015 – Rocky Bridges, American baseball player and coach (b. 1927)
  2015   – David Landau, English-Israeli journalist (b. 1947)
  2015   – Joseph Rotman, Canadian businessman and philanthropist (b. 1935)
  2015   – Charles Hard Townes, American physicist and academic, Nobel Prize laureate (b. 1915)
  2015   – Larry Winters, American wrestler and trainer (b. 1956)
2016 – Carlos Loyzaga, Filipino basketball player and coach (b. 1930)
2017 – Emmanuelle Riva, French actress (b. 1927)
  2017   – Arthur H. Rosenfeld, American physicist (b. 1926)
2018 – Ingvar Kamprad, Founder of IKEA (b. 1926)
  2018   – Mort Walker, American cartoonist (b. 1923)
2019 – Countess Maya von Schönburg-Glauchau, German socialite (b. 1958)
2020 – Lina Ben Mhenni,  Tunisian Internet activist and blogger (b. 1983)
2021 – Cloris Leachman, American actress and comedian (b. 1926)
2022 – Andy Devine,  British TV actor (b. 1942)

Holidays and observances
Christian feast day:
Angela Merici
Blessed Paul Joseph Nardini
Devota (Monaco)
Enrique de Ossó y Cercelló
John Chrysostom (translation of relics) (Anglican, Lutheran, Eastern Orthodox)
Sava (Serbia)
January 27 (Eastern Orthodox liturgics)
Day of the lifting of the siege of Leningrad (Russia)
Liberation of the remaining inmates of Auschwitz-related observances:
Holocaust Memorial Day (UK)
International Holocaust Remembrance Day
Memorial Day (Italy)
Other Holocaust Memorial Days observances

References

External links

 BBC: On This Day
 
 Historical Events on January 27

Days of the year
January